Mission Detroit was a pre-dawn glider-borne combat assault in the American airborne landings in Normandy, made by elements of the U.S. 82nd Airborne Division on the early morning of June 6, 1944, during World War II. It was part of Operation Neptune, the assault portion of the Allied invasion of Normandy, Operation Overlord. Originally slated to be the main assault for the 82nd Airborne, the glider operation instead became the first reinforcement mission after the main parachute combat assault, Mission Boston. The landing zone for mission Detroit was near Sainte-Mère-Église, to the west of Utah Beach.

The objective of the division was to secure the town of Sainte-Mère-Église and to take the bridges along the Merderet River. By doing this, the U.S. 4th Infantry Division coming in at Utah Beach would have easy access to making their way northwards towards the ports at Cherbourg.

Casualties for the 82nd Airborne Division on D-Day were about 1,260 of 6,600, or about 20%. On 6 June 1944 the heavier elements of the division landed by glider in Mission Elmira.

Air movement table - mission Detroit 

SOURCE: D-Day Etat des Lieux

See also

 Mission Chicago
 Mission Elmira
 Operation Tonga

Further reading

External links
 D-Day : Etat des Lieux : Glider missions in Normandy

American airborne landings in Normandy
Operation Overlord